The Ninth National Census of Population of the Dominican Republic was raised from 1–7 December 2010, during the presidency of Leonel Fernández.
This census collected information respect on sex, occupation, age, fertility, marital status, nationality, literacy, ability to vote, and housing.

General results

Regions

Age structure

Country of birth

Provincial and municipal results

See also 
 1920 Santo Domingo Census
 1950 Dominican Republic Census
 1960 Dominican Republic Census
 1970 Dominican Republic Census
 2022 Dominican Republic Census
 People of the Dominican Republic

Notes 
 Only countries with over 100 immigrants are shown.

Sources 
 National Bureau of Statistics (2012). "Ninth National Census of Population, 2010". Volume 1.

References 

Censuses in the Dominican Republic
2010 in the Dominican Republic
Dominican Republic